Cranleigh was a railway station on the Cranleigh Line that served the village of Cranleigh, Surrey, England.

History

Opening in 1865 as "Cranley", its name was changed in 1867 to "Cranleigh" at the request of the Postmaster General as imperfectly addressed letters to "Cranley" were often mistaken for "Crawley" and vice versa.

A passing loop and second platform were installed at the station in 1880. Cranleigh was the busiest station on the line with regular commuter traffic to and from London via Guildford. It also handled regular custom for nearby Cranleigh School, and Southern Railway Class V 4-4-0 "Schools Class" express passenger locomotive no. 936 was named after the school in 1935.

Cranleigh had a substantial goods yard equipped with a large loading gantry. Inward freight consisted mainly of coal which was required, in particular, by the local gasworks, whilst goods outward was mainly timber.

The line was closed in 1965 following The Reshaping of British Railways report of 1963. Cranleigh station was demolished shortly afterwards, replaced by the "Stocklund Square" housing and shopping development. In 2004 part of this development was itself demolished and a Sainsbury supermarket was built on the site. The station's old platform levels still exist behind the shops. The station footbridge also survives, in April 1967 it was re-erected at Liss railway station on the Portsmouth Direct Line.

Future

Studies of the feasibility of reopening the Guildford – Bramley – Cranleigh section of the line were completed in 1994, 1997 and 2009. The 1994 report concluded that the investment required would not justify reinstatement, but Waverley Borough Council has protected the line from development in its Local Plan. The 2009 report estimates that reopening the Guildford – Bramley – Cranleigh section would have a positive benefit-cost ratio of 1.7 to 1 including capital costs.

Other Cranleigh Line stations
 Guildford

See also
 List of closed railway stations in Britain

References

External links
 Cranleigh station on Subterranea Britannica
 Cranleigh station at cranleighrailway.info
 Schools Class Engine No. 936 - Cranleigh
 An evacuee's account of Cranleigh station

Disused railway stations in Surrey
Railway stations in Great Britain opened in 1865
Railway stations in Great Britain closed in 1965
Beeching closures in England
Former London, Brighton and South Coast Railway stations
Cranleigh